Dunoon Primary School is a school in Dunoon, Argyll and Bute, Scotland. It is located in a Category B listed building dating from 1901.

The site was the original 1641 location of Dunoon Grammar School, now on Ardenslate Road.

The building's architect was Lochgilphead native William Fraser, who was asked to design an extension to an earlier infants' school building (designed in 1880 by Robert Alexander Bryden and which burned down in 1958). 1907 additions were done by Boston, Menzies and Morton. The gymnasium wing was added by Robert Cameron in 1934.

There is evidence of an episcopal seat at Dunoon from the latter part of the 15th century. No remains of the Bishop's Palace now exist, with the site now occupied by the playground of the school.

Janitors House
Janitors House is a single-storey attic cottage adjoining the school.

See also
List of listed buildings in Dunoon

References

External links
Dunoon Primary School's official website
HILLFOOT STREET, DUNOON PRIMARY SCHOOL AND JANITOR'S HOUSE - Historic Environment Scotland

Category B listed buildings in Argyll and Bute
Listed buildings in Dunoon
Schools in Dunoon
Primary schools in Argyll and Bute
1901 establishments in Scotland
Listed schools in Scotland
School buildings completed in 1901